Liberia is a district and the largest city in the Guanacaste Province of Costa Rica, located  northwest of the national capital, San José, which is also in the Guanacaste canton. It is a major center for the country's tourism industry.

Liberia has been nicknamed la ciudad blanca (the white city) due to the white gravel that was once used to make the city's roads and the whitewashed colonial houses which used to make up a large part of the city. It had a population of 56,899 in 2013.

History
Modern-day Liberia was founded as a hermitage without any legal or formal act of foundation on 4 September 1769. It was located in a strategic location where the roads from the towns of Rivas, Bagaces, and Nicoya met. The hermitage was used primarily as place of rest by travelers. The area's giant guanacaste trees provided shade for travelers and livestock and over time the area became known as Guanacaste (El Poblado de Guanacaste).

The settlement itself shared a history with Nicaragua and Costa Rica. In 1812 the Cortes of Cádiz created a single autonomous province, covering Nicaragua and Costa Rica, with its capital in León. Nicaragua and Costa Rica achieved independence from Spain on 15 September 1821 after the Spanish defeat in the Mexican War of Independence. After the short-lived First Mexican Empire (1821–1823), Costa Rica (considered a minor provincial outpost at the time) became part of the newly formed Federal Republic of Central America in 1823. The Partido de Nicoya (Nicoya's Party) served as an administrative unit for the Federal Republic of Central America. The Partido de Nicoya comprised much of the territory that today is the province of Guanacaste, Costa Rica. Most of the area, such as the settlements of Nicoya and Santa Cruz, held economic ties to Costa Rican territory such as the growing port of Puntarenas. The settlement of Guanacaste (modern day Liberia), on the other hand, held closer economic ties to Nicaraguan territory like the town of Rivas.

Under the leadership of the villages of Nicoya and Santa Cruz, the Partido de Nicoya voted to annex themselves to Costa Rica on 25 July 1824.

The inhabitants of Guanacaste (modern day Liberia) chose to continue to be part of Nicaragua in 1824. In 1826, after years of dispute, the congress of the Federal Republic of Central America added Guanacaste (modern day Liberia) to Costa Rica.

The village of Guanacaste grew in importance and gradually overtook the village of Nicoya as the most important settlement in the area.
On 23 July 1831, the settlement of Guanacaste was given the title of Villa de Guanacaste. Just a few years later on 3 September 1836 it was given the name Ciudad de Guanacaste (City of Guanacaste).

In 1838 after the Federal Republic of Central America began to dissolve, Costa Rica formally withdrew and proclaimed itself a sovereign state. On 7 December 1848 Costa Rica divided its national territory into provinces, cantons, and districts. The territory encompassing Nicoya, Bagaces, Santa Cruz, Guanacaste (modern day Liberia) and Cañas became part of the newly formed province of Guanacaste.

On 30 May 1854, a government decree changed the name of the City of Guanacaste (Ciudad de Guanacaste) to the City of Liberia (Ciudad de Liberia). The name of the province of Guanacaste was changed to Moracia in honor of then Costa Rican president Juan Rafael Mora Porras.

In August 1859, Juan Rafael Mora Porras was overthrown in a coup d'état orchestrated by Dr. Jose Maria Montealegre. On 20 June 1860 during the administration of new Costa Rican president Dr. Jose Maria Montealegre, the name of the province was switched back from Moracia to Guanacaste. Montealegre kept the name City of Liberia but saw it unfit to keep a province named after a political enemy.

Today, the Annexation of Guanacaste is celebrated annually on 25 July to celebrate the date in which the province became a part of Costa Rica instead of Nicaragua. Liberia holds a large festival as it is the capital of Guanacaste where one can find folk dances, parades, cattle shows, local food, and other cultural traditions in the area. Music is a large part of the festival and the traditional "marimba" is very popularly heard. A parade also takes place in the centre of the city where children put on masks and costumes to march.

Liberia's importance continued to grow and it became a major center for agriculture and livestock. The construction of the Pan-American Highway further increased Liberia's importance and increased commerce in and out of the city. By the late 20th century, Liberia became a major stopping point for tourists traveling to the Pacific Coast beaches of Guanacaste.

Today Liberia and the province of Guanacaste accept 25 July 1824 as their annexation day to Costa Rica.

Geography 
Liberia has an area of  km2 and an elevation of  metres.

Demographics 

For the 2011 census, Liberia had a population of  inhabitants.

Summary
With more than 50,000 inhabitants, Liberia is the regional hub of the Costa Rican northwest. The city center features a modern church, as many Costa Rican towns do, facing a plaza surrounded by locally owned shops and restaurants. Liberia is also home to an expo that takes place in the month of July, celebrating the annexation of Guanacaste Province on 25 July 1824.

Located in the heart of Liberia, Guanacaste, the Museo de Guanacaste represents the civility of Costa Rica, and the embodiment of military abolishment. The Museo de Guanacaste portrays many of the local and national artists. Volunteers come from both internationally and locally to help restore the location and also preserve the cultural heritage.

Tourists pass through Liberia en route to Pacific Coast beaches such as Playa del Coco, Playa Hermosa, Playa Tamarindo or the Papagayo Peninsula. An African safari attraction or zoo called "Africa Mia" is 4 kilometers south of town.  The Museo de Sabanero is also located in Liberia.

Rincón de la Vieja Volcano National Park is located just to the northeast of Liberia. Volcanic hot springs, bubbling clay pots, and numerous waterfalls and rivers may be found along the park's many kilometres of hiking trails.  Hot springs are also located to the southeast of Liberia along the west slopes of Miravalles volcano.

Transportation

Road transportation 
The district is covered by the following road routes:
 National Route 1
 National Route 21
 National Route 918

Airport
The Daniel Oduber Quirós International Airport is 13 kilometres (8 miles) west of the city, following the road to Nicoya. This is the second international airport in the country, after the Juan Santamaría International Airport in San José, and serves a variety of cities in the United States and Canada, as well as London and Amsterdam.

Liberia Airport is very close to the most beautiful beaches from Guanacaste province, such as Tamarindo, Nosara, Sámara, Carrillo, Playa del Coco, Montezuma, Malpaís, and Santa Teresa.

The Liberia River bears the same name as the town.

Sports
Municipal Liberia is the city's major football team, having spent almost 10 years in the Costa Rican Primera División after winning promotion in 2001. They play their home games in the Estadio Edgardo Baltodano Briceño.

Climate 
This area typically has a pronounced dry season. According to the Köppen Climate Classification system, Liberia has a tropical savanna climate, abbreviated Aw on climate maps.

In Liberia, as in the rest of Costa Rica outside the perennially humid Caribbean coast, there are essentially two seasons – the "dry" and the "wet." The dry season runs from November to April, when the temperature is high and very little rainfall, if any, is experienced. The wet season runs from May to October when it often rains throughout the entire country. However, Liberia is considered to be one of the drier cities in the province of Guanacaste, which experiences much less rain than the rest of country. Even in wet seasons, Liberia is quite dry in comparison to the rest of Costa Rica.

If weather is a concern as a traveler, the best time to visit this city would be towards the start of the dry season where the climate is only beginning to get warm, and precipitation from the wet season has decreased. The dry season can get quite hot and sometimes become uncomfortable for those who are not accustomed to such dry heat.

Notable people
 José Carlos Sáenz Esquivel
 Cristian Gamboa
 Levi Vega Martinez

References

External links

Populated places in Guanacaste Province
Districts of Guanacaste Province
Districts of Costa Rica
Populated places established in 1769